Paul Tschang In-Nam (born 30 October 1949) is a Korean prelate of the Catholic Church who has worked in the diplomatic service of the Holy See since 1985, with the title of archbishop and the rank of apostolic nuncio since 2002.

He is the first Korean to hold that title.

Biography 
Paul Tschang In-Nam was born in Seoul, South Korea, on 30 October 1949. He graduated from the Gwangju Catholic University. He was ordained a priest on 17 December 1976. He did parish work and was undersecretary of the Catholic Bishops' Conference of Korea for several years, then studied in Rome from 1978 to 1985, earning a doctorate in dogmatic theology at the Pontifical Lateran University.  He joined the diplomatic service of the Holy See on 1 May 1985. His assignments took him to El Salvador, Ethiopia, Syria, France, Greece, and Belgium.

On 19 October 2002, Pope John Paul II appointed him titular archbishop of Amantia and named him Apostolic Nuncio to Bangladesh. He received his episcopal consecration from John Paul on 6 January 2003.

On 27 August 2007, Pope Benedict XVI named him Apostolic Nuncio to Uganda.

Pope Benedict XVI appointed him Apostolic Nuncio to Thailand and Cambodia and Apostolic Delegate to Myanmar and Laos on 4 August 2012. On 8 February 2017, Tsang In-Nam presented the government of Myanmar with a proposal for the establishment of full diplomatic relations, and on 10 March the Myanmar Parliament gave its consent. On 12 August 2017, Tschang In-Nam's status was changed to Nuncio to Myanmar. 

On 16 July 2022, Pope Francis appointed him Apostolic Nuncio to the Netherlands.

See also
 List of heads of the diplomatic missions of the Holy See

References

External links

 Catholic Hierarchy: Archbishop Paul Tschang In-Nam 

South Korean Roman Catholic archbishops
Apostolic Nuncios to Thailand
Apostolic Nuncios to Uganda
Apostolic Nuncios to Myanmar
Apostolic Nuncios to Bangladesh
Apostolic Nuncios to Cambodia
Apostolic Nuncios to Laos
Living people
1949 births